Elections to Rochford Council were held on 4 May 2006. One third of the council was up for election and the Conservative party stayed in overall control of the council.

After the election, the composition of the council was:

Election result

Ward results

Downhall & Rawreth

Foulness and Great Wakering

Grange

Hawkwell North

Hawkwell South

Hawkwell West

Hockley Central

HullBridge

Rayleigh Central

Rochford

Trinity

Wheatley

Whitehouse

References
2006 Rochford election result
Ward results

2006
2006 English local elections
2000s in Essex